Babbie Yvett Robie Wade Mason (born February 1, 1955) is an American gospel singer, songwriter, writer, and adjunct professor of songwriting at Point University and Lee University, and also a television talk-show host. Born to Georgie and George W. Wade. Mason's father was a Baptist pastor and she hails from at least five generations of ministers. Mason started playing as church pianist in 1964 and was the choir director for the church her father pastored.

Biography
Before becoming a recording artist, Mason was a teacher in Michigan. She later relocated to Georgia in 1980 and continued in her teaching profession. In 1984, Mason left teaching and began the first stages of her musical career. In 1985 she received first place honors in both the songwriting and vocal categories at the Christian Artist Music Seminar in the Rockies. In 1988, Mason signed her first record deal with Word Records out of Nashville, Tennessee.

Career
Mason taught music at East Cobb Middle School in the early 1980s. She went on to pen chart-topping singles such as "Each One, Reach One" and "A World of Difference." Some of her songs have become church standards and songs such as "All Rise," "With All My Heart," and "Hallowed Be Thy Name" can be found among the regular song line ups in weekly church worship services. Her song "All Rise" was one of the most-recorded contemporary Christian songs of the 1990s. In 1996, the album Heritage of Faith featured an arrangement of "Amazing Grace" which included excerpts from her late father's sermon recordings. The album also highlighted "Stop by the Church," written by Sullivan Pugh that earned Mason a Dove Award from the Gospel Music Association and featured a duet with her mother.

In 1999, Mason signed with Spring Hill Music Group and released No Better Place. This project included the single "The House That Love Built," a song she co-wrote with longtime friend and veteran producer Cheryl Rogers.

Mason has always blended pop and contemporary praise, inspirational ballads, and soulful gospel into her music style. However, Mason had longed to record a 1940s-era project à la Billie Holiday, in which Spring Hill granted her wish request and recorded Timeless (2001). Highlights of this collection include "Theme on the 37th (He Can Work It Out)," a song written by Danniebelle Hall, an early Mason influence, and "Black and Blue," which was a poignant reflection on racism that Mason wrote with Turner Lawton.

Mason has performed before U.S. presidents, including Jimmy Carter, and sung at Billy Graham's evangelistic crusades. Appearing with Bill and Gloria Gaither and their 'Homecoming Friends' at such major annual concert events as Praise Gathering and Jubilate. She has also been featured on several of their best-selling projects, including the Grammy Award–winning Kennedy Center Homecoming (1999). Mason is involved in Christian women's conferences and has been a popular guest on the Women of Faith tour.

Mason has authored two books, Treasures of Heaven in the Stuff of Earth (2000) and FaithLift: Put Wings to Your Faith Walk and Soar" (2003). She hosts a television talk show called Babbie's House, which is broadcast on WATC-DT out of Atlanta, Georgia to a national audience as well as throughout Europe and Africa.

Community involvement
Involved in helping aspiring recording artists and songwriters, Mason annually presents her Babbie Mason Music Conference International. She joined the faculty at Atlanta Christian College in East Point and Lee University in Cleveland, Tennessee, as an adjunct professor teaching songwriting.

Personal life
Mason lives on a farm in Carroll County, Georgia, with her husband of over forty-three years, Charles and their two sons. Mason's sons are both aspiring musicians and are active in the music industry.

Discography
 1988: Carry On
 1990: With All My Heart
 1991: A World of Difference
 1992: Comfort and Joy
 1993: Standing in the Gap
 1996: Heritage of Faith
 1997: Praise Celebration
 1999: No Better Place
 2000: The Finest Hour
 2001: Timeless
 2004: Right Where You Are
 2006: All the Best
 2007: Everything
 2013: This I Know for Sure
 2017: Hymns and Blessings

References

External links
Interview with Babbie Mason

1955 births
Living people
African-American songwriters
American gospel singers
Songwriters from Michigan
American women writers
Point University
Lee University
American women songwriters
African-American women musicians
21st-century African-American people
21st-century African-American women
20th-century African-American people
20th-century African-American women